Toni-Ann Natasha Williams (born November 20, 1995) is a Jamaican American artistic gymnast that competed in college gymnastics for the Cal Bears women's gymnastics team. She has also been a member of the Jamaica national gymnastics team since 2010. She is the inaugural Jamaican gymnast to compete in the Olympics, in 2016.

Personal life 
Williams was born in Maryland on November 20, 1995 to parents, Tony and Marlene Williams. As her parents are both from Jamaica, Williams is eligible to compete for that country in FIG international competitions. Through her mother, Williams is a niece of Jamaican politician Anthony Hylton.

She grew up in Randallstown, Maryland, attended Greenspring Montessori School for eleven years, and graduated from Roland Park Country School in 2014. She is currently attending University of California, Berkeley and is a member of the Golden Bears gymnastics team.

She has three sisters, Maya, Kristine and Zitafa. Her sister, Maya, is also a gymnast on the Jamaica National team.

Club career 
Toni-Ann trained at United Gymnastix in Reisterstown, Maryland throughout her whole club career. She moved up to Level 10 in 2009 and joined the Jamaica national gymnastics team in 2010.

In 2011, she was State and Regional Champion and competed in her first international competition, the 2011 World Artistic Gymnastics Championships in Tokyo, Japan.

She was hoping to qualify to the 2012 Olympics but was unable because she didn't meet requirements at the 2011 Worlds. In 2012, she was again crowned State Champion.

Williams represented Jamaica at her second World Championships in 2013, in Antwerp, Belgium.

In 2014, Toni-Ann was State Champion for the fourth time in her Level 10 career.

College career 
Williams' first season in the NCAA was during the 2015 season for the California Bears.

2015 season: Freshman 
Williams quickly became one of Cal's top gymnasts to ever compete in the program, even in her freshman season. On February 13, 2015, during a regular season meet against Oregon State, she broke the school record on vault, scoring a 9.975.

During the regular season, she peaked at #1 nationally on floor on February 23, 2015 and has reached as high as #5 nationally on vault (on March 2, 2015). She qualified to the 2015 NCAA Women's Gymnastics Championships as an individual all-arounder.

2016 Olympics bid 
In February 2015, it was announced that she and British gymnast and UCLA gymnast, Danusia Francis, would participate at the 2015 World Artistic Gymnastics Championships and try to qualify for the 2016 Olympics in Rio de Janeiro.

References 

1995 births
People from Randallstown, Maryland
American female artistic gymnasts
Jamaican female artistic gymnasts
California Golden Bears women's gymnasts
American people of Jamaican descent
Living people
Gymnasts at the 2016 Summer Olympics
Olympic gymnasts of Jamaica
Gymnasts at the 2019 Pan American Games
Pan American Games competitors for Jamaica
NCAA gymnasts who have scored a perfect 10